Yauli District is one of ten districts of the Yauli Province, located in the Department of Junín in the central highlands of Peru. The district was created by the Law No. 6468 in November 7, 1847, during the presidency of Ramón Castilla.

Geography 
The Paryaqaqa of Waruchiri mountain range traverses the district. Some of the highest mountains of the district are listed below:

See also 
 Pumaqucha

References